Ficadusta is a genus of sea snails, marine gastropod mollusks in the family Cypraeidae, the cowries.

Species
Species within the genus Ficadusta include:
 Ficadusta pulchella (Swainson, 1823)
Species brought into synonymy
 Ficadusta barclayi (Reeve, 1857): synonym of Paradusta barclayi (Reeve, 1857)

References

 Orr J. (1985). Hong Kong seashells. The Urban Council, Hong Kong

External links

Cypraeidae